Cotswolds (sometimes called "The Cotswolds") was a European Parliament constituency covering the counties of Gloucestershire and Oxfordshire in England.

Before uniform adoption of proportional representation in 1999, the United Kingdom used first-past-the-post for the European elections in Great Britain. The European Parliament constituencies used under that system were smaller than the later regional constituencies and only had one Member of the European Parliament each.

When it was created in 1979, it consisted of the Westminster Parliament constituencies of Banbury, Cheltenham, Cirencester and Tewkesbury, Gloucester, Mid Oxfordshire, Oxford and Stroud. From 1984 it consisted of Banbury, Cheltenham, Cirencester and Tewkesbury, Gloucester, Stratford-on-Avon, Stroud and Witney. From 1994 it consisted of Cheltenham, Cirencester and Tewkesbury, Gloucester, Stroud, West Gloucestershire and Witney.

Members of the European Parliament

Election results

References

External links
 David Boothroyd's United Kingdom Election Results

European Parliament constituencies in England (1979–1999)
Politics of Oxfordshire
Politics of Gloucestershire
1979 establishments in England
1999 disestablishments in England
Constituencies established in 1979
Constituencies disestablished in 1999